Khalil Herbert (born April 21, 1998) is an American football running back for the Chicago Bears of the National Football League (NFL). He played college football for Kansas before transferring to Virginia Tech in 2020. Herbert was drafted by the Bears in the sixth round of the 2021 NFL Draft.

Early years
Herbert attended American Heritage School in Plantation, Florida. As a senior he rushed for 861 yards and nine touchdowns. He committed to the University of Kansas to play college football.

College career
As a true freshman at Kansas in 2016, Herbert played in eight games with three starts and rushed for 189 yards on 44 carries with three touchdowns. As a sophomore he started six of 11 games, rushing for 663 yards on 120 carries and four touchdowns. He played in 12 games his junior year in 2018 and rushed 113 times for 499 yards and five touchdowns. Herbert played in four games in 2019 before leaving the team. He finished the year with 384 yards on 43 carries with two touchdowns.

Herbert joined Virginia Tech as a graduate transfer in 2020. He took over as the teams starting running back. Against Duke, he set the school record for all-purpose yards in a game with 358.

Professional career

Herbert was drafted by the Chicago Bears in the sixth round, 217th overall, of the 2021 NFL Draft. He signed his four-year rookie contract with Chicago on June 2, 2021. Herbert started the season as the Bears kick returner and third-string running back. He earned more playtime after an injury to starting running back David Montgomery. Herbert capitalized on the opportunity by earning 75 yards on 18 carries in a Week 5 win over the Las Vegas Raiders. He was named the team's starting running back after Damien Williams was placed on the COVID-19 reserve list just days before the Bears Week 6 contest against the Green Bay Packers. Herbert rushed for 97 yards and one touchdown on 19 carries in a 24–14 loss to the Packers. Herbert finished his first season with 433 rushing yards on 103 carries and 2 touchdowns.

Herbert entered the 2022 season as the Bears' second-string running back behind Montgomery. In a Week 3 game against the Houston Texans on September 25, 2022, Herbert rushed for 157 yards on 20 carries and 2 touchdowns after Bears starting running back Montgomery went down with an injury in the Bears 23–20 win. Herbert was named the FedEx Ground Player of the Week for his efforts against the Texans. He suffered a hip injury in Week 10 and was placed on injured reserve on November 15, 2022. He was activated on December 23.

NFL career statistics

References

External links
Virginia Tech Hokies bio
Kansas Jayhawks bio

Living people
Players of American football from Fort Lauderdale, Florida
American football running backs
Kansas Jayhawks football players
Virginia Tech Hokies football players
1998 births
Chicago Bears players
American Heritage School (Florida) alumni
Brian Piccolo Award winners